Romeo Braexir Lemboumba (19 May 1980) is a boxer who represented Gabon at the 2012 Summer Olympics. He did this, in part, by defeating Olympic bronze medalist Bruno Julie at the 2012 African Boxing Olympic Qualification Tournament.

Lemboumba was defeated in the first round by Dominican William Encarnación in the Men's bantamweight event at the 2012 Olympics.

References 

Gabonese male boxers
1980 births
Boxers at the 2012 Summer Olympics
Olympic boxers of Gabon
Living people
Bantamweight boxers
21st-century Gabonese people